Dike is a city in Grundy County, Iowa, United States. The population was 1,304 at the 2020 census, an increase of 38% over the total of 944 residents in 2000. It is part of the Waterloo–Cedar Falls Metropolitan Statistical Area.

History
Chester Thomas Dike, a railroad construction engineer, inspired the name Dike. Dike chose the site and laid out the town in 1900. The community was incorporated on January 16, 1901.

Geography

Demographics

2010 census
As of the census of 2010, there were 1,209 people, 475 households, and 365 families residing in the city. The racial makeup of the city was 98.8% White, 0.2% African American, 0.2% Asian, 0.1% from other races, and 0.6% from two or more races. Hispanic or Latino of any race were 1.2% of the population.

There were 475 households, of which 33.9% had children under the age of 18 living with them, 66.7% were married couples living together, 7.8% had a female householder with no husband present, 2.3% had a male householder with no wife present, and 23.2% were non-families. 19.4% of all households were made up of individuals, and 8% had someone living alone who was 65 years of age or older. The average household size was 2.55 and the average family size was 2.94.

The median age in the city was 42.1 years. 26.3% of residents were under the age of 18; 6.2% were between the ages of 18 and 24; 22% were from 25 to 44; 29.6% were from 45 to 64; and 16% were 65 years of age or older. The gender makeup of the city was 50.0% male and 50.0% female.

2000 census
As of the census of 2000, there were 944 people, 379 households, and 275 families residing in the city. The racial makeup of the city was 99.62% White, 1.21% African American, 0.32% Asian, and 0.85% from two or more races. Hispanic or Latino of any race were 0.21% of the population.

There were 379 households, out of which 33.0% had children under the age of 18 living with them, 63.6% were married couples living together, 6.3% had a female householder with no husband present, and 27.2% were non-families. 24.5% of all households were made up of individuals, and 10.6% had someone living alone who was 65 years of age or older. The average household size was 2.49 and the average family size was 2.97.

Age spread: 25.7% under the age of 18, 8.2% from 18 to 24, 26.9% from 25 to 44, 24.9% from 45 to 64, and 14.3% who were 65 years of age or older. The median age was 38 years. For every 100 females, there were 99.2 males. For every 100 females age 18 and over, there were 95.8 males.

The median income for a household in the city was $65,750, and the median income for a family was $55,518. Males had a median income of $45,000 versus $28,321 for females. The per capita income for the city was $20,532. About 2.2% of families and 4.7% of the population were below the poverty line, including 6.1% of those under age 18 and 3.3% of those age 65 or over.

Education
Dike–New Hartford Community School District is the local school district. It was established on July 1, 1996, by the merger of the Dike and New Hartford school districts.

References

External links

The City of Dike, Iowa Website Portal style website, Government, Community organizations and activities, and more
City-Data Comprehensive Statistical Data and more about Dike

Cities in Iowa
Cities in Grundy County, Iowa
Waterloo – Cedar Falls metropolitan area